First Baptist Church of Atlanta, is a Baptist megachurch located in Dunwoody, Georgia, a northern suburb of Atlanta. It is affiliated with the Southern Baptist Convention. Originally located in Atlanta city limits, First Baptist Atlanta moved to the suburb of Dunwoody, Georgia. The senior pastor is Anthony George, succeeding the long-tenured and well known Charles Stanley who pastored there for 49 years.

History

The church was founded in 1848 in midtown Atlanta, Georgia. In the late 20th century, a commercial facility was purchased on Atlanta's Interstate 285 and the church relocated to the larger, more accessible property in Dekalb County. In 2006, the church inaugurated the new building.

On September 13, 2020, Charles Stanley, former president of the Southern Baptist Convention, announced his transition to pastor emeritus after having been senior pastor of the church since 1971. In 2017, Anthony George was named as Stanley's successor.

Ministries
First Baptist Church Atlanta began a television and radio ministry in 1972, one year after Stanley became the senior pastor. It is now known as In Touch Ministries. Together, the teaching of Stanley and beliefs of FBA are available globally—translated into more than 100 languages via radio, television broadcast, audiotapes, videotapes, CDs, DVDs, pamphlets, books and a monthly devotional magazine, In Touch.

References

External links
 First Baptist Atlanta Website
 In Touch Website

Evangelical megachurches in the United States
Megachurches in Georgia
Baptist churches in Atlanta
Southern Baptist Convention churches
Religious organizations established in 1848
1848 establishments in Georgia (U.S. state)